Jamila Mayanja is an Ugandan entrepreneur and educator.

Early life 
Jamila Mayanja was born in 1988 in Konge, Buziga in a family of 14 children. She studied from Kitante Primary school, sat for her O-level and A-level in 2004 and 2006 respectively from Nabisunsa Girls school. Jamila holds a bachelor's degree in Business Administration/Marketing from Makerere University.

Achievements 
Mayanja participated in the Young African Leaders Initiative [YALI] in the United States in August 2015. She was nominated for the young Achiever's awards under the category of Social Entrepreneurship.

Professional life
Mayanja is the CEO of Smart Girls Uganda which trains young girls and women to build self esteem, leadership, governance and employability skills. She founded J Mobile Laundry Services, a door to door laundry service company that employs over 30 disadvantaged young women. She trains them in entrepreneurship skills. She partnered with Rotary Uganda and through the entrepreneurship program 10-30 women have established their own businesses.

Through Smart Girls she started a franchise company called J Mobile Laundry Services that has contributed to curbing unemployment among the youth in the Kampala suburbs, where she works as the team leader. The company moves door-to-door providing domestic laundry services. Through J Mobile Laundry Services Ltd. she employs youth with a plan to give them simple work while training them in entrepreneurship and employability skills with an aim to keeping them employed or saving their salary so that they can start their own enterprises to employ more youth. After the Youth African Leadership Initiative (YALI) program, Jamila will continue her work of empowering young women and will strive to have more than 1000 youth working in (or owning) enterprises each year.

In 2011 she co-founded Haven Anti-Aids foundation to sensitize the youth about HIV/AIDS. She partnered with Generation change-Uganda Chapter a United States project so as to inspire youth to bring positive change in their communities.

Personal life
Mayanja married Jamil Kalinabiri.

References

1988 births
Living people
People from Kampala
Makerere University alumni
Ugandan women business executives
People educated at Nabisunsa Girls' Secondary School